Turffontein is a suburb of Johannesburg, South Africa. It is located in Region F of the City of Johannesburg Metropolitan Municipality.

History
Prior to the discovery of gold on the Witwatersrand in 1886, the suburb lay on land on one of the original farms called Turffontein. It became a suburb on 27 September 1886.

Sports
It is home to Turffontein Racecourse, established in 1887 by the Johannesburg Turf Club.

References

Johannesburg Region F